First Flight may refer to:
 Maiden flight, the first flight of a new aircraft type

 First Flight Airport, in North Carolina, United States
 First Flight High School, in Kill Devil Hills, North Carolina
 First Flight (sculpture), a sculpture in Milwaukee, Wisconsin

 First Flight (horse)
 First Flight Handicap, a horse race 
 First Flight Tournament, a golf tournament in Japan

 First Flight (Star Trek: Enterprise), an episode of the television series
 First Flight (film), an animated short film
 Green Lantern: First Flight

 First Flight (novel), a novel by Chris Claremont
 First Flight: Maiden Voyages in Space and Time, a collection of short-stories

 Magik One: First Flight, a music compilation 

It may also refer to: 
 The first recorded powered, controlled flight of a heavier-than-air craft 
 First solo flight
 First aerial circumnavigation